Lucienne is a given French name. It is the feminine form of Lucien, meaning "Light". Variants include Lucinda, Lucie (French) and Lucy. People named Lucienne include:

 Lucienne Abraham
 Lucienne Bisson
 Lucienne Bloch
 Lucienne Boyer
 Lucienne Day
 Lucienne Delyle
 Lucienne Heuvelmans
 Lucienne N'Da
 Lucienne Robillard
 Lucienne "Lucy" Rokach

See also 
 Lucianne Goldberg
 AMD Lucienne, an Accelerated Processing Unit (APU) series by AMD

French feminine given names